Grenada was an American Thoroughbred racehorse. He won the 1880 Preakness Stakes, Belmont Stakes, and Travers Stakes. He is one of only seven horses to have won these three races.

Background

Grenada was bred in Kentucky at Woodburn Stud by Alexander John Alexander. He was sired by King Alfonso, a successful sire of several stakes winners. His dam was Mattie Gross, a daughter of the famous Lexington. When he was a yearling, Grenada was sold at the 1878 Woodburn yearling sale for $1,300 to George L. Lorillard.

Racing Career

Two-year-old season

Grenada started 11 times as a two-year-old. He won the Club Purse at Long Branch, as well as the Windsor Hotel Stakes. He came second six times, and placed third once. He was unplaced in his remaining two races.

Three-year-old season

Grenada started 19 times as a three-year-old, winning ten races. He started the season by winning the Potomac Stakes on May 19th. Nine days later, Grenada ran in the Preakness Stakes. Ridden by jockey Lloyd Hughes, Grenada beat out the field of four other horses. He came second in the Withers Stakes on June 3rd, losing by a head, before running in the Belmont Stakes on the 8th. Once again ridden by Lloyd Hughes, Grenada was the favorite, and won the race against three others.  He went on to win several more races in a row, the Lorillard Stakes on June 12th, the Coney Island Derby on June 24th, the Travers Stakes on July 17th (winning by a length), the Atlantic Handicap on August 21st, and the Jerome Stakes on October 2nd. He came second in a race on October 7th, but won the Dixie Stakes on October 19th. He ran a dead heat in the Breckenridge Stakes with Glidelia. Despite this string of victories, Grenada did not run up to his usual standard in a number of races, and lost several as a result.

Later career

Grenada started six times as a four-year-old, winning four races. He won the Peyton Handicap, came third in the Baltimore Cup, and won the Jockey Club Handicap, and two Handicap Sweepstakes. He was unplaced in the Club Purse, and injured his foot during the race. He was never the same following the injury. Grenada raced only three times as a five-year-old, coming second in the Welter Cup and Westchester Cup, and not placing at all in the Members Cup. Grenada was retired from racing shortly afterwards. Overall, he started 39 times during his career, winning 16 races.

Stud Career

After his retirement from racing, Grenada stood at stud in Ohio during the 1883 season. His stud fee was $30.

Pedigree

References

1877 racehorse births
Racehorses bred in Kentucky
Racehorses trained in the United States
Preakness Stakes winners
Belmont Stakes winners
Thoroughbred family A20